Teiuș is a town in Alba County, Transylvania, Romania, with a population of 7,284 inhabitants. The town, declared as such in 1994, administers four villages: Beldiu (Marosbéld), Căpud (Magyarkapud), Coșlariu Nou (Újkoslárd), and Pețelca (Pacalka).

The town is located near the confluence of the Geoagiu River with the Mureș River. Teiuș is a junction point on the Cluj-Napoca–Sighișoara railway. It has several old churches, the most notable being the 17th century Uniate church and the Roman Catholic church, built for John Hunyadi in 1449 and rebuilt (1701–1704) in a simple Gothic style.

Natives
 Ioan Bălan, Romanian bishop of the Greek-Catholic Church
 Norica Câmpean, race walker

Climate
Teiuș has a humid continental climate (Cfb in the Köppen climate classification).

<div style="width:70%;">

Image gallery

References

Populated places in Alba County
Localities in Transylvania
Towns in Romania